Darauli (Vidhan Sabha constituency) is a Legislative Assembly constituency in Siwan district in the Indian state of Bihar. It is reserved for scheduled castes from 2010. Earlier it was an open seat (unreserved). The current MLA of this Legislative Assembly constituency is Satyadeo Ram.

Overview
As per Delimitation of Parliamentary and Assembly constituencies Order, 2008, No. 107 Darauli (Vidhan Sabha constituency) (SC) is composed of the following: Darauli, Guthani and Andar community development blocks.

Darauli Assembly constituency is part of No. 18 Siwan (Lok Sabha constituency).

Members of Legislative Assembly

Election results

2020 result

2015 result

References

External links
 

Assembly constituencies of Bihar
Politics of Siwan district